The profectio ("setting forth") was the ceremonial departure of a consul in his guise as a general in Republican Rome, and of an emperor during the Imperial era. It was a conventional scene for relief sculpture and imperial coinage. The return was the reditus and the ceremonial reentry the adventus.

References

External links
ARTH

Processions in ancient Rome
Roman Empire sculptures
Military of ancient Rome